Caroline Gruss is a Swiss curler.

At the national level, she is a 1996 Swiss women's champion and a 1992 Swiss junior champion curler.

Teams

Women's

References

External links 

Living people
Swiss female curlers
Swiss curling champions
Year of birth missing (living people)